Huai'an East railway station is a railway station located in Huai'an, China. It is situated at an intersection between two lines: the Lianyungang–Zhenjiang high-speed railway and the Xuzhou–Yancheng high-speed railway.

It is the second station to serve Huai'an, the first being Huai'an railway station.

History
The station opened on 16 December 2019.

References

Railway stations in Jiangsu
Railway stations in China opened in 2019